Into the Sun is the debut studio album by musician Sean Lennon. It was released by the Beastie Boys' label Grand Royal (distributed by Capitol Records, a division of EMI which had been the longtime home of Sean's father John Lennon) on May 8, 1998 in Japan and on May 19, 1998 in the United States.

Background 

Into the Sun was recorded during Lennon's time performing with Zak Starkey alongside Yuka Honda, who was Lennon's girlfriend at the time and also produced and performed on the album. Lennon has said it was "inspired by my girlfriend". Into the Sun was recorded at Sear Sound in New York, with the exception of the track "Queue", which was recorded at another New York studio, The Magic Shop. The album was engineered and mixed by Tom Schick at Sear Sound and mastered by Bob Ludwig at Gateway Mastering Studios.

A voice on the final track, "Sean's Theme", which softly speaks "Goodnight, Sean", is sometimes mistakenly attributed to father John Lennon; however, it is, in fact, that of Walter Sear, an owner of Sear Sound. Sean has said it is in tribute to his father, whose tribute to Sean, "Beautiful Boy (Darling Boy)" closes with "Goodnight, Sean. See you in the morning, bright and early."

Track listing 
All songs written by Sean Lennon, except where noted.

"Mystery Juice"– 5:26
"Into the Sun"– 3:22
"Home"– 3:05
"Bathtub" (Lennon, Yuka Honda)– 4:00
"One Night"– 2:06
"Spaceship" (Lennon, Timo Ellis)– 4:17
"Photosynthesis"– 6:46
"Queue" (Lennon, Honda)– 3:45
"Two Fine Lovers"– 3:17
"Part One of the Cowboy Trilogy"– 1:48
"Wasted"– 1:31
"Breeze"– 3:57
"Sean's Theme"– 5:52
"Intermission" (Japanese bonus track)– 5:36
"5/8" (Japanese bonus track)– 4:48

Personnel 
Credits for Into the Sun adapted from liner notes.

Sean Lennon – vocals, guitar, bass guitar, drums, keyboards, Omnichord, harmonica, percussion, Mellotron, artwork
Zak Starkey – sequencer, electronic drums, guitar, vibraphone, keyboards, drum machine, glockenspiel, Mellotron, piano, percussion, production
Miho Hatori – vocals, percussion on "Into the Sun"
Yuka Honda – drums on "Mystery Juice", "Home" and "Spaceship", electric guitar, bass guitar, backing vocals on "Spaceship"
John Medeski – Hammond C3 organ on "Queue"
Dave Douglas – trumpet on "Photosynthesis" and "Sean's Theme", horn arrangement on "Sean's Theme"
Josh Roseman – trombone on "Photosynthesis"
Greg Ribot – flute on "Photosynthesis"
EJ Rodriguez – percussion on "Photosynthesis"
Brad Jones – upright bass on "Photosynthesis"
Kenny Wollesen – drums, shaker on "Photosynthesis", marimba, timpani on "Queue"
Little Eric Wood – Intergalactic-Tape-Machine on "Spaceship"
Chaki – cymbal on "Bathtub", engineering (assistant)
Walter Sear – vocals on "Sean's Theme"
Fred Kevorkian – digital editing
Tom Schick – engineering
John Reigart – engineering (assistant)
Bob Ludwig – mastering

Charts

References 

Sean Lennon albums
Yuka Honda albums
Albums produced by Yuka Honda
1998 debut albums
Grand Royal albums